Countess of Strathmore is a title given to the wife of the Earl of Strathmore. Women who have held this title include:

Elizabeth Lyon, Countess of Strathmore (1663 to 1723)
Susan Lyon, Countess of Strathmore and Kinghorne (c.1709-1754)
Mary Bowes, Countess of Strathmore and Kinghorne (1749-1800)
Frances Bowes-Lyon, Countess of Strathmore and Kinghorne (1832-1922)
Cecilia Bowes-Lyon, Countess of Strathmore and Kinghorne (1862-1938)